World Wide Adventures is a generalized name applied to Warner Bros. live-action short films of the 1960s. Usually, the trade magazines like BoxOffice only listed the one-reelers (running about 10 minutes in length) under this heading, with the longer films simply dubbed “specials.” For the most part, this was a handy marketing logo for a wide range of shorts of the documentary genre.

Overview

Although the studio sharply curtailed theatrical “live-action” shorts production by 1957, a selective number of featurettes and independent films were distributed along with the Looney Tunes and Merrie Melodies animated cartoons as material shown before the main feature. By this time it was more profitable to re-release older films rather than make new ones, but theater owners expected a few “new” offerings each year. (At least one of their rivals, Universal Pictures, continued a consistent schedule of both live-action and animated short subjects through 1972.)

While the bulk were independent travelogues, the in-house producers Cedric Francis and William L. Hendricks (famous for the final cartoons featuring Daffy Duck and Cool Cat) supervised a few themselves.

Despite being largely forgotten over the decades, a handful have enjoyed a second life as “extras” between main features on Turner Classic Movies, particularly such titles as Kingdom of the Saguenay and See Holland Before It Gets Too Big.

List of titles

Since the live-action short subjects made during this period seldom received proper coverage in periodicals and reference books, this chronological listing is incomplete in its information:

Marketed as "World Wide Adventures" or "Specials"

Assorted later shorts distributed by Warner Bros.

See also
List of short subjects by Hollywood studio#Warner Brothers
Travelogue (films)

Notes

References
 Liebman, Roy Vitaphone Films – A Catalogue of the Features and Shorts 2003 McFarland & Company
 Motion Pictures 1960-1969 Catalog of Copyright Entries 1971 Library of Congress
 Catalog of Copyright Entries: Third Series Volume 24, Parts 12-13, Number 1: Motion Pictures and Filmstrips 1970 Library of Congress 
 Catalog of Copyright Entries: Third Series Volume 25, Parts 12-13, Number 1: Motion Pictures and Filmstrips 1971 Library of Congress 
 Catalog of Copyright Entries: Third Series Volume 27, Parts 12-13, Number 1: Motion Pictures 1973 Library of Congress 

Film series introduced in 1962
Warner Bros. short films
Documentary film series
Short film series